Pennsylvania Route 51 (PA 51) is a major state highway in Western Pennsylvania. PA 51 is the termination point for Pennsylvania Route 43, Pennsylvania Route 48 and Pennsylvania Route 88. The route is a major connection from Uniontown and the rest of Fayette County to Pittsburgh.

The highway is four-lane highway south of Pittsburgh as it passes through Pittsburgh's South Hills, but narrows to a two-lane road through several boroughs along the Ohio River.  It becomes four lanes again after passing Chippewa Township in Beaver County and continues to the Ohio border.  In the South Hills, PA 51 (Saw Mill Run Boulevard), along with US 19, is one of the major routes in and out of Pittsburgh, as it provides access to several bridges and tunnels.  PA 51 is one of the highways that enters the West End Circle, an intersection in the West End.

Route description

Fayette and Westmoreland counties
PA 51 begins as Pittsburgh Street in downtown Uniontown at an intersection with U.S. Route 40 Business. As PA 51 heads north, it exits Uniontown and intersects with U.S. Route 119, Uniontown's bypass. North of US 119, PA 51 is a rural, multi-lane divided highway that is also known as Pittsburgh Road. It then shifts towards the northwest, continuing as a multi-lane divided highway. In Perry Township, PA 51 intersects Pennsylvania Route 201 at a cloverleaf interchange. North of PA 201, it enters the borough of Perryopolis as Fuller Drive; after leaving the city to the north, PA 51 begins to parallel the Youghiogheny River.

Upon entering Westmoreland County, PA 51 intersects the southern terminus of Pennsylvania Route 981. To the northwest in Sweeneys Crossroads, the road intersects Pennsylvania Route 201 again. PA 51 divides before reaching the county border and also passes by Rostraver Airport. Route 51 only spends seven miles (11 km) in Westmoreland County, all in Rostraver Township.

Allegheny and Beaver counties

Upon entering Allegheny County, PA 51 is called Hayden Boulevard, and it meets with Pennsylvania Route 136 at a diamond interchange. PA 51 intersects the southern terminus of Pennsylvania Route 48 in Forward Township before entering the boroughs of Elizabeth and West Elizabeth. In West Elizabeth, after crossing the Monongahela River via the Regis R. Malady Bridge, PA 51 immediately intersects with Pennsylvania Route 837. It then continues towards Jefferson Hills in the northwest, where it meets the northern terminus of Pennsylvania Route 43 (Mon-Fayette Expressway) at exit 54. PA 43 is expected to extend further north of PA 51. Northwest of PA 43, PA 51 becomes Clairton Boulevard. In Pleasant Hills and West Mifflin, PA 51 passes by the former Century III Mall, which was formerly one of the largest malls in the area.  The stretch of PA 51/Clairton Blvd. continues through Baldwin Borough, Whitehall, and Brentwood.  At the border of Brentwood and Overbrook, PA 51 becomes Saw Mill Run Boulevard.

At the southern tip of Pittsburgh, PA 51 intersects the northern terminus of Pennsylvania Route 88 before continuing towards the north as Saw Mill Run Blvd. It meets with the Liberty Tunnel connector, which leads towards the Liberty Bridge and Interstate 579; PA 51 also begins a concurrency with U.S. Route 19 Truck at this junction. The US 19 Truck/PA 51 concurrency ends when US 19 TRK joins Interstate 376, U.S. Route 22, and U.S. Route 30 at exit 5.  At this point, PA 51 begins a brief concurrency with U.S. Route 19 through the West End Bypass, a short expressway in Pittsburgh's West End section. The concurrency ends as US 19 crosses the Ohio River on the West End Bridge while PA 51 turns left, heading toward McKees Rocks to the northwest as West Carson Street, paralleling the Ohio River. Entering McKees Rocks, it makes a 90 degree turn to become Locust Street, then makes another turn to become Charties Avenue, and makes a final turn towards the northwest to become Island Avenue. In Stowe Township, PA 51 becomes Robinson Boulevard (formerly Fleming Park Rd.) and passes south of Neville Island on the Ohio River. After a couple of S-curves, PA 51 becomes Coraopolis Road and intersects Interstate 79 at exit 64. It becomes State Avenue in Coraopolis before dividing into two one-way streets called 4th and 5th Avenues. North of Coraopolis, PA 51 continues to parallel the Ohio River as University Boulevard in Moon Township. It then becomes Stoops Ferry Road and passes through Crescent Township on McGovern Boulevard before entering Beaver County. The route spends 36 miles in Allegheny County.

At the Beaver County line, PA 51 intersects the eastern terminus of Pennsylvania Route 151. North of PA 151, PA 51 enters South Heights as Jordan Street. The route extends past the Ambridge-Aliquippa bridge, through the city of Aliquippa and West Aliquippa.  Farther to the north, the highway heads towards the north as Constitution Boulevard entering Monaca as Beaver and Pennsylvania Avenues before making a 90-degree turn towards the north. PA 51 crosses the Ohio River on the Monaca-East Rochester Bridge, entering the borough of East Rochester. It makes a 90-degree turn to the west to begin a concurrency with Pennsylvania Route 65. In Rochester, PA 51/PA 65 meet with Pennsylvania Route 18; the concurrency ends in downtown Rochester, when PA 51 begins a concurrency with Pennsylvania Route 68. PA 51/PA 68 cross the Beaver River on the Beaver Bridge. In Bridgewater, the PA 51/PA 68 concurrency ends when PA 51 makes a 45-degree turn towards the northwest and continues towards the northwest as Constitution Boulevard. In Chippewa Township, it intersects Interstate 376 (James E. Ross Highway) at exit 31. Northwest of I-376, Route 51 intersects the western terminus of Pennsylvania Route 588 and Pennsylvania Route 251. In South Beaver Township, PA 51 intersects Pennsylvania Route 168 and continues towards the northwest as Constitution Boulevard. PA 51 terminates (ends) at the Ohio state line; in Ohio, it continues as Ohio State Route 14.

History
Route 51 was first signed in 1927.  The north section was signed first, followed by the section between Pittsburgh and Uniontown.  Major construction projects included a bypass of Perryopolis built in 1950, the West End Bypass in Pittsburgh that was completed in 1953, and the interchange at the southern portal of the Liberty Tunnels in Pittsburgh. Unlike PA 88 and PA 28, Route 51 wasn't truncated in 1961 to reduce concurrencies, making it the only major state route (not including U.S. routes or Interstate routes) to still pass through Pittsburgh following the separation of PA 65 and PA 50 from PA 88 & PA 28, respectively; PA 51 serves as a link between PA 88 & PA 65 and, via PA 60, I-376, & I-279, a link between PA 28 & PA 50.

Before the turnpikes were built, Route 51, alongside Ohio State Route 14, served as the main corridor connecting Pittsburgh and Cleveland.

The Saw Mill Run Boulevard section of the highway was the first direct connection between Pittsburgh and the South Hills once the Liberty Tunnel was completed.  It significantly decreased the driving time to Pittsburgh from the cities of Clairton, Duquesne, McKeesport.

Improvements are planned at the intersection with PA 88 south of Pittsburgh, where bottlenecks occur regularly.  Other improvements planned include new interchanges at the Liberty Tunnel and West End Bridge (West End Circle), a center median for the rest of Saw Mill Run Boulevard, and an improved intersection with Woodruff Street.

Saw Mill Run Expressway (canceled)
The Saw Mill Run Expressway was a highway proposed for the South Hills.  It would have been built on the same right-of-way as Saw Mill Run Boulevard.  In 1964, while designated as "the worst bottleneck in Western Pennsylvania," a plan was made to turn the crowded highway into an expressway.  The plan was proposed to the Department of Highways and included a renovation of the Liberty Tunnel, several widening projects, new turning lanes, and a central median.  The plan would have required cooperation from the surrounding communities.

The finished product was to include a  limited access expressway from Overbrook to the West End.  It would have been twice the width of the current highway and had a total cost of nearly $150 million.  Interest in the expressway declined once the Southwestern Pennsylvania Regional Planning Commission expressed concerns about business along the corridor, and the project was dropped in 1973.

Major intersections

Related routes

Pittsburgh truck route

Pennsylvania Route 51 Truck (PA 51 Truck) is a truck route along major roads in downtown Pittsburgh, such as I-376, I-279, and I-579, in an effort to bypass PA 51, which features some unsafe S-Curves and falling rocks that could be deleterious for trucks.  Motorists traveling on PA 51 should use PA 51 Truck to travel downtown and avoid these dangers.

Elizabeth truck route

Pennsylvania Route 51 Truck (PA 51 Truck) was a truck route of PA 51 that bypassed the weight-restricted Regis R. Malady Bridge over the Monongahela River between Elizabeth and West Elizabeth, on which trucks over 32 tons and combination loads over 40 tons are prohibited. The route followed McKeesport Road, Lincoln Boulevard, Glassport-Elizabeth Road, the Clairton-Glassport Bridge over the Monongahela River, and PA 837. The route was formed in 2013; however, as of 2021, there were no weight restrictions listed on the bridge by PennDOT,. 
As of 2022, the route is still signed.

Previously there was a  truck route in the Pittsburgh suburb of Elizabeth. The truck designation was not intended for vehicles already on PA 51, but for those entering the highway southbound. A cloverleaf has been established to direct traffic between Elizabeth's main street (known as Center Ave and McKeesport Road on different ends of town), but its narrow and winding design makes it difficult for trucks to access Route 51 southbound. As a result, they were directed to enter onto Route 51 northbound, cross the bridge over the Monongahela River, and use a special u-turn exit to reach southbound lanes of travel. This truck route was removed after a weight limit was imposed on the Regis R. Malady Bridge over the Monongahela River.

See also

References

External links

Pennsylvania Highways: PA 51
Route 51 history

051
Transportation in Pittsburgh
Transportation in Allegheny County, Pennsylvania
Transportation in Fayette County, Pennsylvania
Transportation in Westmoreland County, Pennsylvania
Transportation in Beaver County, Pennsylvania